The Politics of Apulia, (Apulia, Italy), takes place in a framework of a presidential representative democracy, whereby the President of Regional Government is the head of government, and of a pluriform multi-party system. Executive power is exercised by the Regional Government. Legislative power is vested in both the government and the Regional Council.

Executive branch
The Regional Government (Giunta Regionale) is presided by the President of the Region (Presidente della Regione), who is elected for a five-year term, and is composed by the President and the Ministers (Assessori), who are currently ten.

List of presidents

Legislative branch

The Regional Council of Apulia (Consiglio Regionale della Puglia) is composed of 70 members and is elected with proportional representation plus a majority premium for the winning coalition. The council is elected for a five-year term, but, if the President suffers a vote of no confidence, resigns or dies, under the simul stabunt vel simul cadent clause (introduced in 1999), also the council will be dissolved and there will be a fresh election.

Local government

Provinces and Metropolitan City

Apulia is divided into five provinces and one metropolitan city:

Municipalities
Apulia is also divided into 258 comuni (municipalities), which have even more history, having been established in the Middle Ages when they were the main places of government. There are eight provincial capital cities in Apulia, as the Province of Barletta-Andria-Trani is the only province in Italy with three capital cities.

There are 258 communes in Apulia (as of January 2019):

41 in the Metropolitan City of Bari
10 in the Province of Barletta-Andria-Trani
20 in the Province of Brindisi
61 in the Province of Foggia
97 in the Province of Lecce
29 in the Province of Taranto

Provincial capitals

Other municipalities with more than 50,000 inhabitants

Parties and elections

Latest regional election

In the latest regional election, which took place on 20–21 September 2020, Michele Emiliano of the Democratic Party was re-elected President with 46.8% of the vote.

References

External links
Apulia Region
Regional Council of Apulia
Constitution of Apulia

 
Apulia